Carex halliana is a tussock-forming species of perennial sedge in the family Cyperaceae. It is native to western parts of the United States.

See also
List of Carex species

References

halliana
Taxa named by Liberty Hyde Bailey
Plants described in 1884
Flora of California
Flora of Oregon
Flora of Washington (state)